Régis Lhuillier (born 28 May 1980) is a French former cyclist. He rode in the 2003 Giro d'Italia, but did not finish.

Major results
1997
 1st  Junior National Road Race Championships 
1998
 1st  Junior National Road Race Championships 
2002
 9th Overall Tour du Limousin

References

1980 births
Living people
French male cyclists
People from Saint-Dié-des-Vosges
Sportspeople from Vosges (department)
Cyclists from Grand Est